The Petrópolis Municipal Nature Park is a municipal nature park in the state of Rio de Janeiro, Brazil.

Location

The Petrópolis Municipal Nature Park is in the historical center of the city of Petrópolis, Rio de Janeiro.
There are tables and benches where visitors can relax, eat or contemplate nature.

History

The campaign to preserve the area, prevent it being used for other purposes and create the park began in 1992, with various civil societies arranging activities and events. 
In 2002 these organizations created the Comitê Pró-Parque Ecológico (Committee for the Ecological Park), which  mobilized the people of the city to create the park.
The Petrópolis Municipal Nature Park was included in the Central Rio de Janeiro Atlantic Forest Mosaic, created in December 2006.
It is part of the Petrópolis Environmental Protection Area and the Atlantic Forest Biosphere Reserve.

Notes

Sources

Municipal nature parks of Brazil
Protected areas of Rio de Janeiro (state)
2002 establishments in Brazil